The Crestwood School District is a midsized, suburban public school district which serves the Boroughs of Nuangola, Penn Lake Park and White Haven and Dennison Township, Dorrance Township, Fairview Township, Rice Township, Slocum Township and Wright Township in Luzerne County, Pennsylvania. According to 2000 federal census data, it serves a resident population of 18,299.

In 2009, the district's per capita income was $21,944 while the median family income was $56,503. In the Commonwealth, the median family income was $49,501  and the United States median family income was $49,445, in 2010.

The district operates: Crestwood High School, Crestwood Middle School, Fairview Elementary School and Rice Elementary School.

Extracurriculars
The district offers a variety of clubs and sports. Crestwood high school competes in the Pennsylvania Interscholastic Athletic Association under district 2. District sports range from class AA to class AAAAA.

The Crestwood field hockey team has won four state titles (1988,1999, 2003, 2004), the second most in the state of Pennsylvania.

In the 2008-09 school year, the school received a district championship in girls' tennis, a state 3rd place in wrestling, a state 3rd place in the 1600m run, and a state 3rd place in the pole vault in track and field.

References

External links
 Crestwood School District

School districts in Luzerne County, Pennsylvania